Pedicinus hamadryas is a species of sucking louse. Its typical host is the baboon .

References 

Lice
Parasites of primates
Insects described in 1910